Pilisvörösvár is a district in north-western part of Pest County. Pilisvörösvár is also the name of the town where the district seat is found. The district is located in the Central Hungary Statistical Region.

Geography 
Pilisvörösvár District borders with Szentendre District to the northeast, Budapest to the southeast, Budakeszi District to the south, Esztergom District (Komárom-Esztergom County) to the northwest. The number of the inhabited places in Pilisvörösvár District is 9.

Municipalities 
The district has 2 towns, 1 large village and 6 villages.
(ordered by population, as of 1 January 2013)

The bolded municipalities are cities, italics municipality is large village.

Demographics

In 2011, it had a population of 53,201 and the population density was 407/km².

Ethnicity
Besides Hungarian majority, the main minorities are the German (approx. 7,000), Slovak (1,100), Roma (500), Russian and Romanian (150).

Total population (2011 census): 53,201
Ethnic groups (2011 census): Identified themselves: 56,661 persons:
Hungarians: 46,448 (81.98%)
Germans: 7,231 (12.76%)
Slovaks: 1,097 (1.94%)
Others and indefinable: 1,885 (3.33%)
Approx. 3,500 persons in Pilisvörösvár District did declare more than one ethnic group at the 2011 census.

Religion
Religious adherence in the county according to 2011 census:

Catholic – 23,848 (Roman Catholic – 23,458; Greek Catholic – 384);
Reformed – 4,318;
Evangelical – 652;
Orthodox – 78;
Judaism – 76;
other religions – 1,153; 
Non-religious – 7,577; 
Atheism – 979;
Undeclared – 14,520.

Gallery

See also
List of cities and towns in Hungary

References

External links
 Postal codes of the Pilisvörösvár District

Districts in Pest County